Chunee (or Chuny) was an Indian elephant who was brought to Regency London in 1811.

Three elephants were brought to England in East India Company ships between 1809 and 1811. The third of these was Chunee. He travelled on the East Indiaman, from Bengal, arriving in England in July 1811.

The other two elephants, also owned by Stephani Polito at some point, arrived in England in September 1809, and June 1810.

"Mr Polito ... has obtained possession of a remarkably fine Elephant, brought to England in the Hon. East India Company's ship, Winchelsea, Capt. William Moffat, which will be exhibited at Rumsey [sic] fair on Monday; and it is expected he will be offered for public inspection for a day or two, in this town , on his way to the Exeter 'Change London."

The second elephant was brought to England from Sri Lanka on the East India Company ship  in June 1810.

Chunee was originally exhibited at the Covent Garden Theatre, but was bought by circus owner Stephani Polito to join his menagerie at Exeter Exchange on the Strand in London. The menagerie was bought by Edward Cross in 1817. The events in which the elephant was put to death in 1826 became a cause célèbre.

Career

Chunee weighed nearly 7 tons, was 11 feet tall, and was valued at £1,000. He was tame, and was originally a theatrical animal, appearing on stage with Edmund Kean. His plays included Blue Beard, at the Theatre Royal, Covent Garden, and the pantomime Harlequin and Padmanaba, or the Golden Fish, at the Theatre Royal, Drury Lane.

Chunee was trained to take a sixpence from visitors to the menagerie to hold with his trunk before returning it. An entry in Lord Byron's journal records a visit to Exeter Exchange on 14 November 1813, when "The elephant took and gave me my money again — took off my hat — opened a door — trunked a whip — and behaved so well, that I wish he was my butler."

Death

Chunee became dangerously violent towards the end of his life, attributed to an "annual paroxysm" (perhaps his musth) aggravated by a rotten tusk which gave him a bad toothache. On 26 February 1826, while on his usual Sunday walk along the Strand, Chunee ran amok, killing one of his keepers. He became increasingly enraged and difficult to handle over the following days, and it was decided that he was too dangerous to keep. The following Wednesday, 1 March, his keeper tried to feed him poison, but Chunee refused to eat it. Soldiers were summoned from Somerset House to shoot Chunee with their muskets. Kneeling down to the command of his trusted keeper, Chunee was hit by 152 musket balls, but refused to die. Chunee was finished off by a keeper with a harpoon or sword. The floor of his cage was deeply covered with his blood, and it was said that the sound of the elephant in agony was more alarming than the reports of the soldiers' guns.

Aftermath

Hundreds of people paid the usual shilling entrance fee to see his carcass butchered, and then dissected by doctors and medical students from the Royal College of Surgeons. His skeleton weighed 876 lb (397 kg), and was sold for £100 and exhibited at the Egyptian Hall in Piccadilly, and later at the Royal College of Surgeons in Lincoln's Inn Fields, the bullet holes clearly visible. His skin weighed 17 cwt (1,900 lb or 860 kg), and was sold to a tanner for £50. Chunee's skeleton, along with a display of the affected tusk, was on display in the Royal College of Surgeon's Museum until 11 May 1941 when the museum was almost totally destroyed by a direct hit from a high-explosive bomb; the Chunee skeleton was destroyed.

The manner of Chunee's death was widely publicised, with illustrations printed in popular newssheets of volley after volley being shot into his profusely bleeding body. Recipes were published for elephant stew, along with maudlin poems saying "Farewell, poor Chuny". Letters were printed in The Times protesting at the barbarity of the process, and the poor quality of the living conditions of the animals in the menagerie. The Zoological Society of London was founded in April 1826. 

The menagerie at Exeter Exchange declined in popularity after Chunee's death. The animals were moved to King's Mews in 1828, and the building was demolished in 1829.

See also
List of individual elephants
Mary (elephant) 
Topsy (elephant)
Tyke (elephant)

References

Further reading

1826 animal deaths
Animal cruelty incidents
Cruelty to animals
Deaths by firearm in London
Individual elephants
Circus animals
History of the City of Westminster
Individual animals in England
19th century in London
1826 in England